Jamel William Herring (born October 30, 1985) is an American former professional boxer who held the WBO junior lightweight title from 2019 to 2021.

Personal life 
Jamel Herring was born in Rockville Centre, New York to Michael Mitchell and Jeanine Herring. His mother remarried to Harry Elliby. He was raised in Coram, New York in its Gordon Heights neighborhood. While a sophomore at Longwood High School, Jamel began boxing in 2001 when his soon to become trainer Austin Hendrickson invited him to the boxing gym for workouts. Herring enlisted in the United States Marine Corps in October 2003 at Parris Island, South Carolina.  He has served two tours of duty in Iraq and was based in Camp Lejeune, North Carolina, where he earned the rank of Sergeant. Jamel has six children: Kamren Herring (2004), Stephen Herring (2007), Ariyanah Herring (2009), Jamel Herring Jr. (2010), Jazmyne Herring (2013), and Justice Herring (2017). His daughter Ariyanah died July 27, 2009, from SIDS. The opening ceremony of the 2012 Olympic Games was the 3rd anniversary of her death. Jamel married his childhood friend Jennifer Dickerson-Herring on September 26, 2015.

Amateur career 
Herring began training in 2001. He suffered his first amateur loss to Daniel Jacobs on July 20, 2002 during the New York Junior Olympics Finals.

Herring had to balance training as a boxer with his duties as an active United States Marine. He was deployed to Fallujah, Iraq in 2005. After he returned he immediately tried out for the All Marine Corps boxing team in January 2006. While on the team, Herring competed all over the national scene and even fought against former world champion Jesse Vargas at the 2006 National PAL tournament. He was deployed again in 2007 to Al Taqaddum.  Shortly after his return, he went back to the All Marine Corps boxing team in Camp Lejeune, North Carolina. From early 2008, he would be trained under Ron Simms, Reuben Woodruff, and Narcisco Aleman. Simms would eventually be replaced by former All Army coach and 1996 USA Olympic Assistant coach Jesse Ravelo. Herring won a silver medal at the 2010 World Military Games and took a gold medal at the 2011 and 2012 Armed Forces Championships while a Sergeant in the United States Marine Corps.

Trained under Ravelo, Woodruff, and Aleman, Jamel would win gold in the 2012 Olympic Trials defeating multiple nationals champions. In the first round of the tournament he defeated Tommy Duquette, Mike Reed in the second round, Pedro Sosa in the semi finals, and in the finals he defeated Pedro Sosa again. He would eventually move on to the 2011 AIBA World Championships but lost in a close contest in the first round, forcing him to fight for his spot again at the 2012 USA Boxing Nationals. After winning the Nationals, he went on to compete in the Americas Qualifiers where he would win a bronze medal and earn a slot at the 2012 games. Herring qualified for the 2012 Olympics. Jamel, along with the entire US boxing team, only had two weeks prior to the games to train together as a complete team. He was the only United States Marine to compete at the London Olympics and the first active duty marine to qualify for the US boxing team since 1992.

Professional career 
After returning from the London games, Herring made the decision to finish out his service with the United States Marine Corps and become a professional boxer. He relocated from Camp Lejeune, North Carolina, to Cincinnati, Ohio to work with Mike Stafford.

In May 2019, he became a world champion by defeating Masayuki Ito to win the WBO junior lightweight title. Herring outboxed Ito in front of the sold-out crowd, winning almost every round of the fight on two judges' scorecards, and 66 percent of the rounds on the third judge's. Scorecards were 118-110, 118-110 and 116-112 in favor of Herring.

In his first title defense, Herring faced Lamont Roach Jr. Herring boxed well through most of the fight, but Roach Jr was far from an easy opponent. Herring was almost dropped by Roach Jr in the ninth round, but managed to recover just before the bell. In the end, he had done enough to earn the unanimous decision win, 117-111 twice and 115-113 on the scorecards.

His second title defense came against Jonathan Oquendo, on September 5, 2020, after two previously canceled dates, both because Herring tested positive for COVID-19. Herring was in control during the fight, and was landing the more effective shots. Herring managed to drop Oquendo in the third round. The aggressive Oquendo was going head first in multiple occasions during the fight, which ultimately resulted in a cut above Herring's eye. Herring was not able to continue after the eighth round and his corner decided he is unable to continue.

In September 2020, it was announced that Herring had signed a contract with management and promotions company MTK Global, with the company taking an advisory role. Herring said of the decision, "I'm very excited about this next step in my career. I know that by adding MTK Global as an advisor along with Brian McIntyre as my manager, I have the strongest team in the game."

On April 3, 2021, Herring defeated former two-division champion Carl Frampton in Dubai, United Arab Emirates via sixth-round technical knockout to retain his WBO title. Herring's victory over Frampton would ultimately be the last fight of the latter's career, who retired soon after.

Herring lost his title in his subsequent fight on October 23, 2021 against undefeated former WBO featherweight champion Shakur Stevenson, when he was defeated via tenth-round technical knockout. Herring was behind on all three judges' scorecards at the time of the stoppage. He retired in May 2022.

Professional boxing record

See also
List of world super-featherweight boxing champions

References

External links

Jamel Herring - Profile, News Archive & Current Rankings at Box.Live

|-

1985 births
Living people
American male boxers
Boxers from New York (state)
People from Coram, New York
African-American boxers
Boxers at the 2012 Summer Olympics
Olympic boxers of the United States
United States Marines
United States Marine Corps personnel of the Iraq War
Winners of the United States Championship for amateur boxers
Southpaw boxers
World super-featherweight boxing champions
World Boxing Organization champions